The New Delhi–Chennai main line is a railway line connecting Chennai and Delhi cutting across southern part of the Eastern Coastal Plains of India, the Eastern Ghats, the Deccan Plateau and the Yamuna valley.

History
The Agra–Delhi chord was opened in 1904. Some parts of it were relaid during the construction of New Delhi (inaugurated in 1927–28).

The Agra–Gwalior line was opened by the Maharaja of Gwalior in 1881 and it became the Scindia State Railway.

The Indian Midland Railway built the Gwalior–Jhansi line and the Jhansi–Bhopal line in 1889.

The Bhopal–Itarsi line was opened by the Begum of Bhopal in 1884. Itarsi was linked with Nagpur between 1923 and 1924.

The period of construction of the Nagpur–Balharshah line is uncertain.
 
The Vijayawad–Chennai line was constructed in 1899.

The Wadi–Secunderabad line was built in 1874 with financing by the Nizam of Hyderabad. It later became part of Nizam's Guaranteed State Railway. In 1889, the main line of the Nizam's Guaranteed State Railway was extended to Vijayawada, then known as Bezwada.

With the completion of the Kazipet–Balharshah link in 1929, Chennai was directly linked to Delhi.

Intermediate branch lines

Sections
The -long trunk line, amongst the long and busy trunk lines connecting the metros, has been treated in more detail in smaller sections:
 Agra Chord
 Agra–Bhopal section
 Bhopal–Nagpur section
 Nagpur–Kazipet section
Kazipet–Vijayawada section
 Vijayawada–Chennai section

Electrification
The Vijayawada–Chennai section electrified by 1980.

The Vijayawada–Kazipet sector was electrified in 1985–88.

The Kazipet–Ramagundam–Balharshah–Nagpur sector was electrified in 1987–89.

The Bhopal–Itarsi sector was electrified in 1988–89 and the Nagpur–Itarsi sector in 1990–91.

The Agra–Bhopal sector was electrified in 1984–89.

The Agra–Faridabad section was electrified in 1982–85.

Speed limits
The Delhi–Chennai line (Grand Trunk route) is classified as a "Group A" line which can take speeds up to 160 km/h.

Passenger movement
New Delhi, Mathura Junction, Agra Cantt., Gwalior, Jhansi, Bhopal, Bhopal Habibganj, Nagpur, Ramagundam, Warangal, Vijayawada, Gudur and Puratchi Thalaivar Dr. M.G. Ramachandran Central railway station, on this line, are amongst the top hundred booking stations of Indian Railway.

Diamond quadrilateral
The Delhi–Chennai line is a part of the diamond quadrilateral. The routes connecting the four major metropolises (New Delhi, Mumbai, Chennai and Kolkata), along with their diagonals, known as the diamond quadrilateral, carry about half the freight and nearly half the passenger traffic, although they form only 16 per cent of the length.

References

5 ft 6 in gauge railways in India
Railway lines opened in 1929
Rail transport in Delhi
Rail transport in Haryana
Rail transport in Uttar Pradesh
Rail transport in Rajasthan
Rail transport in Madhya Pradesh
Rail transport in Maharashtra
Rail transport in Andhra Pradesh
Rail transport in Tamil Nadu